Angelo Crescenzo (born 5 August 1993) is an Italian karateka athlete who won a gold medal at the 2018 World Karate Championships. He competed in the 2020 Summer Olympics, in Men's −67 kg.

Life 
He was born in Sarno.

He has qualified to represent Italy at the 2020 Summer Olympics in Tokyo, Japan.

In November 2021, he won the silver medal in the men's 60 kg event at the 2021 World Karate Championships held in Dubai, United Arab Emirates.

He lost his bronze medal match in the men's 60 kg event at the 2022 Mediterranean Games held in Oran, Algeria. He won the bronze medal in the men's kumite 60 kg event at the 2022 World Games held in Birmingham, United States.

Achievements

References

Italian male karateka
Living people
1993 births
Sportspeople from the Province of Salerno
Competitors at the 2018 Mediterranean Games
Competitors at the 2022 Mediterranean Games
European Games medalists in karate
Karateka at the 2019 European Games
European Games bronze medalists for Italy
Mediterranean Games competitors for Italy
Karateka at the 2020 Summer Olympics
World Games medalists in karate
World Games bronze medalists
Competitors at the 2022 World Games
21st-century Italian people